Anthology, also known as Anthology: The Best of The Supremes, first released in May 1974, is a series of same or similarly titled compilation albums by The Supremes. Motown released revised versions in 1986, 1995 and 2001. In its initial version, a 35-track triple record collection of hits and rare material, the album charted at #24 on Billboard's "Black Albums" and #66 on "Pop Albums".

The 1974 LP was included in Robert Christgau's "basic record library" of 1950s and 1960s music, published in Christgau's Record Guide: Rock Albums of the Seventies. In 2012, Rolling Stone listed the 2001 version of the album at #423 in its list of "Rolling Stone's 500 Greatest Albums of All Time".

History 
The Anthology series of The Supremes' releases began in 1974 with a three-disc compilation album that surpassed in scope any releases previously compiled to represent "one of the 1960s' most popular groups". The three-album set not only included all of the R&B hits and most of the pop hits of the Supremes, but also included several tracks of the band's more experimental material, including forays made by the band into 1960s British pop, country music and musical theatre. The August 1986 CD release of the album added 15 songs to a total of 50 while the re-release on September 28, 1995, raised the number to 52. On December 18, 2001, Motown released a fourth version of Anthology with 50 songs representative of The Supremes' period with Diana Ross. This version includes three previously unreleased versions of songs in addition to the 1960s hits and a selection of cover songs.

The 1974 and 2001 collections focused solely on the 60s Supremes with Diana Ross and Florence Ballard, whereas the 1986 and 1995 versions included hits by the 70s version of the Supremes, featuring Jean Terrell and Scherrie Payne as lead singers.

Track listing

1974 Edition 

Side One (The Early Sessions)
 "Let Me Go The Right Way"
 "A Breath Taking Guy"
 "When The Lovelight Starts Shining Through His Eyes"
 "Standing At The Crossroads Of Love"
 "Run, Run, Run"
 "Where Did Our Love Go"

Side Two (The Big Boom)
 "Baby Love"
 "Ask Any Girl"
 "Come See About Me"
 "Stop! In The Name Of Love"
 "Back In My Arms Again"
 "Nothing But Heartaches"

Side Three (Non-Stop Hitmaking)
 "I Hear A Symphony"
 "My World Is Empty Without You"
 "Love Is Like An Itching In My Heart"
 "You Can't Hurry Love"
 "You Keep Me Hangin' On"
 "Love Is Here And Now You're Gone"

Side Four (New Horizons)
 "The Happening"
 "Reflections"
 "In And Out Of Love"
 "Forever Came Today"
 "Some Things You Never Get Used To"
 "Love Child"

Side Five (Versatile Stylists)
 "A Hard Day's Night"
 "Funny How Time Slips Away"
 "You Send Me"
 "Falling In Love With Love"
 "I'm The Greatest Star"

Side Six (Memories, Moving On)
 "I'm Gonna Make You Love Me" (with the Temptations)
 "I'm Livin' In Shame"
 "The Composer"
 "I'll Try Something New" (with the Temptations)
 "No Matter What Sign You Are"
 "Someday We'll Be Together"

1986 Edition 
Except where otherwise noted, tracks composed by Lamont Dozier, Brian Holland and Eddie Holland.

 "Your Heart Belongs to Me" (Smokey Robinson) – 2:34
 "Let Me Go the Right Way" (Berry Gordy Jr.) – 2:33
 "A Breathtaking Guy" (Robinson) – 2:21
 "When the Lovelight Starts Shining Through His Eyes" – 2:39
 "Standing at the Crossroads of Love" – 2:28
 "Run Run Run" – 2:21
 "Where Did Our Love Go" – 2:30
 "Baby Love" – 2:34
 "Ask Any Girl" – 2:43
 "Come See About Me" – 2:36
 "Stop! In the Name of Love" – 2:49
 "Back in My Arms Again" – 2:51
 "Nothing But Heartaches" – 2:55
 "I Hear a Symphony" – 2:40
 "My World Is Empty Without You" – 2:33
 "Love Is Like an Itching in My Heart" – 2:55
 "You Can't Hurry Love" – 2:46
 "You Keep Me Hangin' On" – 2:41
 "Love Is Here and Now You're Gone" – 2:36
 "The Happening" (Frank DeVol, Dozier, Faye Hale, B. Holland) – 2:49
 "A Hard Day's Night" (John Lennon, Paul McCartney) – 2:20
 "Funny How Time Slips Away" (Willie Nelson) – 4:12
 "You Send Me" (Sam Cooke) – 2:09
 "Falling in Love With Love" (Lorenz Hart, Richard Rodgers) – 2:28
 "I'm the Greatest Star" (Bob Merrill, Julie Styne) – 5:55
 "Reflections" – 2:48
 "In and Out of Love" – 2:38
 "Forever Came Today" (Dozier, E. Holland) – 3:13
 "Some Things You Never Get Used To" (Nickolas Ashford, Valerie Simpson) – 2:23
 "Love Child" (Deke Richards, Pam Sawyer, R. Dean Taylor, Frank Wilson) – 2:54
 "I'm Gonna Make You Love Me" (with the Temptations) (Kenny Gamble, Jerry Ross, Jerry Williams Jr.) – 3:06
 "I'm Livin' in Shame" (Richards, Sawyer, Taylor, Wilson) – 2:55
 "The Composer" (Robinson) – 2:58
 "I'll Try Something New" (with The Temptations) (Robinson) – 2:17
 "The Young Folks" (George Gordy, Allen Story) – 3:09
 "No Matter What Sign You Are" (Henry Cosby, B. Gordy) – 2:47
 "Someday We'll Be Together" (Jackey Beavers, Johnny Bristol, Harvey Fuqua) – 3:19
 "Up the Ladder to the Roof" (Vincent DiMirco, Wilson) – 3:10
 "Everybody's Got the Right to Love" (Lou Stallman) – 2:36
 "Stoned Love" (Yennik Samoht, Wilson) – 4:05
 "Nathan Jones" (Leonard Caston Jr., Kathy Wakefield) – 2:58
 "Floy Joy" (Robinson) – 2:30
 "Touch" (Sawyer, Wilson) – 3:39
 "Automatically Sunshine" (Robinson) – 2:36
 "Your Wonderful, Sweet Sweet Love" (Robinson) – 2:56
 "I Guess I'll Miss the Man" (Stephen Schwartz) – 2:38
 "Bad Weather" (Ira Tucker, Stevie Wonder) – 3:02
 "It's All Been Said Before" (Dennis Lambert, Brian Potter) – 2:26
 "I'm Gonna Let My Heart Do the Walking" (Harold Beatty, Holland, Holland) – 3:09

1995 edition

Songs added to the 1995 edition 
 "I Want a Guy" (Berry Gordy, Freddie Gorman, Brian Holland)
 "Buttered Popcorn" (Berry Gordy, Barney Ales)
 "Long Gone Lover" (William "Smokey" Robinson)
 "Send Me No Flowers"
 "Mother Dear" (Brian Holland, Lamont Dozier, Edward Holland Jr.)
 "Too Hurt to Cry, Too Much in Love to Say Goodbye"
 "He's All I Got"
 "Remove This Doubt"
 "Things Are Changing" (Brian Wilson/Phil Spector)
 "I'm Gonna Make It (I Will Wait for You)"
 "Then"
 "Sweet Thing"
 "Keep an Eye" (Nickolas Ashford, Valerie Simpson)
 "Discover Me (And You'll Discover Love)" (Beatrice Verdi, Johnny Bristol, Doris McNeil)
 "River Deep, Mountain High" (with the Four Tops) (Phil Spector)
 "Paradise" (Harry Nilsson)

2001 edition

Songs added to the 2001 edition 
 "I Want a Guy" (B Gordy, Freddie Gorman, B. Holland) – 2:54
 "Buttered Popcorn" (Barney Ales, B. Gordy) – 2:58
 "The Tears" (Robinson) – 2:49
 "Whisper You Love Me Boy" (single mix) (Dean, E. Holland) – 2:42
 "Mother Dear" (Dozier, Holland, Holland) – 2:45
 "This Old Heart of Mine (Is Weak for You)" (Dozier, Holland, Holland, Sylvia Moy) – 2:36
 "Things Are Changing" (Phil Spector) – 2:59
 "He" (Richard Mullan, Jack Richards) – 3:48
 "The Nitty Gritty" (Lincoln Chase) – 2:55
 "Sweet Thing" (Ivy Jo Hunter, William "Mickey" Stevenson) – 2:28
 "Try It Baby" (with The Temptations) (B. Gordy) – 3:50
 "It Makes No Difference Now" (Floyd Tillman) – 3:28
 "Ain't That Good News" (Cooke) – 2:49
 "Bewitched, Bothered and Bewildered" (Hart, Rodgers) – 2:16
 "Whistle While You Work" (Frank Churchill, Larry Morey) – 2:21
 "If a Girl Isn't Pretty" (Bob Merrill) – 3:14
 "Where Do I Go/Good Morning, Starshine" (Galt MacDermot, James Rado, Gerome Ragni) – 3:08
 "Can't Take My Eyes Off You" (Bob Crewe, Bob Gaudio) – 2:20
 "Rhythm of Life" (Diana Ross and The Temptations) (Cy Coleman, Dorothy Fields) – 4:13
 "The Impossible Dream" (live) (Joe Darion, Mitch Leigh) – 4:43

Songs removed from the 1986 edition 

 "Ask Any Girl"
 "Automatically Sunshine"
 "Bad Weather"
 "Everybody's Got the Right to Love"
 "Falling in Love With Love"
 "Floy Joy"
 "Funny How Time Slips Away"
 "I Guess I'll Miss the Man"
 "I'm Gonna Let My Heart Do the Walking"
 "I'm the Greatest Star"
 "It's All Been Said Before"
 "Nathan Jones"
 "Standing at the Crossroads of Love"
 "Stoned Love"
 "Touch"
 "Up the Ladder to the Roof"
 "You Send Me"
 "The Young Folks"
 "Your Wonderful, Sweet Sweet Love"

Personnel

Performance 
 H. B. Barnum – conductor
 Diana Ross – vocals
 Mary Wilson – vocals
 Florence Ballard – vocals
 Barbara Martin – vocals
 Cindy Birdsong – vocals
 The Temptations (Melvin Franklin, Eddie Kendricks, Paul Williams, Otis Williams, Dennis Edwards) – vocals
 The Andantes – background vocals
 Maxine Waters – background vocals
 Julia Waters – background vocals
 Johnny Bristol – background vocals
 The Funk Brothers - instrumentation

Series production 

 Nickolas Ashford – producer
 Gil Askey – producer
 H. B. Barnum – arranger
 Mathieu Bitton – design
 Candace Bond – executive producer
 Johnny Bristol – producer
 The Clan – producer
 Henry Cosby – producer
 Hal Davis – producer
 Lamont Dozier – producer
 Harvey Fuqua – producer
 Geoff Gans – art direction
 Marc Gordon – producer
 Berry Gordy, Jr. – producer
 George Gordy – producer
 Suha Gur – mixing, digital remastering
 Amy Herot – executive producer
 Dan Hersch – mastering
 Brian Holland – producer
 Lawrence Horn – producer
 Bill Inglot – mastering, compilation producer
 Wade Marcus – arranger, producer
 Sherlie Matthews – producer
 Warren "Pete" Moore – producer
 Gene Page – string arranger
 Clarence Paul – producer
 Kevin Reeves – mixing
 Deke Richards – producer
 Paul Riser – arranger
 Smokey Robinson – producer
 Valerie Simpson – producer
 Andrew Skurow – associate producer
 Phil Spector – producer
 R. Dean Taylor – producer
 Vartan – art direction
 Harry Weinger – compilation producer
 Norman Whitfield – producer
 Frank Wilson – producer
 Stevie Wonder – producer

Certifications

References 

1974 greatest hits albums
1986 greatest hits albums
1995 greatest hits albums
2001 greatest hits albums
The Supremes compilation albums
Albums produced by Hal Davis
Albums produced by Johnny Bristol
Albums produced by Smokey Robinson
Albums produced by Brian Holland
Albums produced by Edward Holland Jr.
Albums produced by Lamont Dozier
Albums produced by Harvey Fuqua
Albums produced by Deke Richards
Albums produced by Lawrence Horn
Motown compilation albums